Coppelia is an ice cream parlor chain in Cuba, originally built in a project led by Fidel Castro.  Coppelia is state-run and sells in Cuban pesos (CUP). Havana's Coppelia employs more than 400 workers and serves  of ice cream to 35,000 customers each day. It is named after the ballet Coppélia.

When business started in 1966, it ran with an impressive count of 26 flavors and 25 combinations. Today, lines are generally long and the supply and selection of flavors is scarce, with usually only one or two available at any given time.

Havana
Havana's Coppelia is a Cuban Revolution modernist building from 1966. It features five white granite discs annexed to one great helicoidal staircase, with wood and tinted glass division panels, all under one big round roof supported by twelve reinforced concrete arachnid columns. The flying-saucer-shaped building represents a UFO that has landed in Havana and is one of the largest ice cream parlors in the world. Holding a maximum of 1000 guests, it is located on the part of Calle 23 known as La Rampa in the Vedado district, and occupies the entire city block between Calles 23 and 21, and Calles K and L. Coppelia has been a major city landmark for both locals and visitors since its opening in 1966, but acquired additional fame when it was featured in one of the most widely viewed Cuban films, Strawberry and Chocolate.

Coppelia was originally built in a project led by Fidel Castro to introduce his love of dairy products to the Cuban population, creating the Coppelia enterprise to produce those products. The original aim was to produce more ice cream flavors than the big American brands by buying the best machines from the Netherlands and Sweden. Fidel's longtime secretary, Celia Sánchez, named Coppelia after her favorite ballet Coppélia.

The site of Coppelia Havana was originally taken by the Reina Mercedes Hospital, which functioned from 1886 to 1954 when it was demolished. Originally, there were plans to build another hospital on the site, but plans later changed and a 50-story skyscraper was to be built on the site, but all these plans fell through. A tourism promotion pavilion, Parque INIT, then occupied the site, then the Centro Recreativo Nocturnal (night-time entertainment center), before Coppelia finally took over.

Mario Girona was the architect of the new ice cream palace built on the site in 1966. The building was influenced by the biomorphic modernism of Italian, Mexican and South American modernists like Pier Luigi Nervi, Felix Candela and Oscar Niemeyer, who saw the opportunity to leave behind the rectangular forms of the steel high rises and utilize the plasticity of reinforced concrete. Populist ideology helped shape the design and use of the public space.

The park area surrounding the building features lush groundcover and a canopy of towering Banyan trees which provide shade for open-air dining areas. Curvilinear paths lead to an elevated circular pavilion inside of which the only indoor seating is located.

In March 2012 Venezuela announced plans to cooperate with Cuba to build a Coppelia ice cream plant in the country and introduce sales of the product there. In April of the same year the Cuban newspaper Trabajadores ran an article exposing the scarcity and poor quality of the product as well as the inattentive service at the parlor, despite the recently completed renovations. Among the problems were broken freezers.

Gallery

See also
Ubre Blanca

References

1966 establishments in North America
Buildings and structures in Havana
Fidel Castro
Food and drink companies of Cuba
Ice cream parlors
Restaurants in Cuba
Restaurants established in 1966